Anisodactylus binotatus is a species of ground beetle native to Europe. It was discovered as being introduced to Canterbury, New Zealand in 1938.

References

Anisodactylus
Beetles described in 1787
Beetles of Europe
Beetles of New Zealand